B+ decay may refer to:

 Positron emission (beta plus decay)
 B meson decay